, known as , is a Japanese television personality and actress, and former singer and model.

Career
Ehara was scouted in Harajuku and began working as a model. She began a career as a singer under her birth name, releasing her first single "Chotto Dake" in 1985. In 1988, she was invited by Shi-Shonen bassist Seiji Toda to form their own band called Fairchild. Taking on the stage name You, she served as vocalist and songwriter. In 1990, You secured a regular spot on the comedy duo Downtown's weekly Thursday night radio show MBS Youngtown. She next accepted a regular role on Downtown's television show Downtown no Gottsu Ee Kanji. With the shift in her career focus from singing to television, the band Fairchild broke up in 1993.

While continuing as a regular on various television and radio shows, she has authored two books, appeared in a number of films, and is a regular contributor (and occasional cover girl) for the fashion magazine In Red. She was nominated for the Best Supporting Actress award at the 2005 Japanese Academy Awards for her performance as the absent mother in Nobody Knows. You has been a studio commentator for the reality television series Terrace House since its inception in 2012.

Since October 2016, You and her fellow Terrace House commentator Ryota Yamasato have co-hosted the puppet show Nehorin Pahorin on NHK Educational TV. They each voice mole puppets who co-interview the non-famous guest represented by a pig puppet. The anonymity afforded via the puppets and voice modulation allows the guests to talk candidly about topics not usually covered on mainstream TV, such as idol otaku or host club addiction.

You recently featured in the French-Japanese film Umami, directed by Slony Sow, and starring Gérard Depardieu, production of which took place in Hokkaido, Japan and Saumur, France.

Personal life
You was married to Tetsuka Minoru, guitarist of the rock band The Privates, from 1991 until getting divorced in January 1997. That same year, she married actor Shunsuke Matsuoka in July and gave birth to their son in November. You and Matsuoka divorced in 2005.

Selected filmography

Television
 Downtown no Gottsu Ee Kanji (1991–1997)
 Kisarazu Cat's Eye (2002)
 Manhattan Love Story (2003)
 Oh! My Girl!! (2008)
 Second Virgin (2010), Akiko
 Hakken! Gyōten!! Puremia Mon!!! Doyō wa Dameyo! (2013–present)
 Going My Home (2012), Takiko Ito
 Terrace House: Boys × Girls Next Door (2012–2014), 
 Terrace House: Boys & Girls in the City (2015–2016)
 EXD44 (2016–present)
 Nehorin Pahorin (2016–present)
 Terrace House: Aloha State (2016–2017)
 7Rules (2017–present)
 Terrace House: Opening New Doors (2017–2019)
 Terrace House: Tokyo 2019–2020 (2019–2020)
 The Way of the Househusband (2020), Miku's Mother
 Come Come Everybody (2021), Midori Kijima

Film
 Nobody Knows (2004), Keiko Fukushima
 Be with You (2004), Yuji's Teacher
 The Uchōten Hotel (2006), Sakura Cherry
 GeGeGe no Kitarō (2007), Rokurokubi
 Still Walking (2008), Chinami Kataoka
 Boys on the Run (2010), Shiho
 Friends: Mononoke Shima no Naki (2011)
 R100 (2013), Setsuko Katayama
 Terrace House: Closing Door (2015)
 Her Sketchbook (2017), Mika Konuma
 You, Your, Yours (2018), Hoshino
 Umami (2021), Noriko
 Mom, Is That You?! (2023), Kotoko Andersson

Discography

Albums
 Birthday (1985)
 
 Cachemire (1994)

Bibliography

References

External links

1964 births
Living people
20th-century Japanese actresses
20th-century Japanese women singers
20th-century Japanese singers
21st-century Japanese actresses
21st-century Japanese women singers
21st-century Japanese singers
Japanese women pop singers
Japanese television personalities
Japanese female models
People from Koganei, Tokyo
Actresses from Tokyo
Singers from Tokyo
Japanese film actresses
Japanese television actresses